Tracy Moore may refer to:
Tracy Moore (basketball) (born 1965), American basketball player
Tracy Moore (Canadian journalist) (born 1975), Canadian journalist

See also
Tracey Moore (born 1960), Canadian voice actress
Tracey Moore (cricketer) (1941–2018), English cricketer